Charles Caldwell McChord (December 3, 1859 – November 24, 1937) was an American lawyer and legislator who served as chairman of the Interstate Commerce Commission until 1926. He was born in Springfield, Kentucky, to Robert C. and Laura (Hynes) McChord. On January 31, 1888 he married Nellie Grundy. He was a member of the Kentucky State Senate from 1895 to 1899.

In 1918 he served on the Railway Wage Commission.

He died in New York City November 24, 1937.

References

External links

1859 births
1937 deaths
People of the Interstate Commerce Commission
Railway Wage Commission
Kentucky state senators
People from Springfield, Kentucky
Kentucky lawyers